Girmeli is a village in the Nusaybin District of Mardin Province in Turkey. The village is populated by Assyrians and by Kurds of the Mizizex and Omerkan tribes. It had a population of 3,339 in 2021.

References 

Villages in Nusaybin District
Assyrian communities in Turkey
Kurdish settlements in Mardin Province